Paul Workman may refer to:

 Paul Workman (journalist), Canadian journalist
 Paul Workman (scientist) (born 1952), British scientist